Karura Hydroelectric Power Station, commonly referred to as Karura Power Station, also Karura Dam, is a planned  90 MW hydropower station in Kenya.

Location
The power station would be located across River Tana, in Embu County, sandwiched between Kindaruma Hydroelectric Power Station upstream and Kiambere Hydroelectric Power Station downstream.

Overview
The power station is a run of river, hydropower installation, with capacity of 90 Megawatts. The design calls for the waters of River Tana to be diverted through a "dug-out channel" and then delivered to the power-generation site, thereby reducing the "displacement of communities". Kenya Electricity Generating Company (KenGen), a company, owned 70 percent by the government of Kenya, is the developer and owner of this power station.

The development, decided upon circa 2012, is being developed to stabilize the national electricity grid with increased hydro-power, in view of the increased intermittent sources in the country's energy mix, including solar and wind. Feasibility and ESIA studies were conducted in the 2009 to 2012 time-frame. Karura and Mutonga were two locations that were identified as potential sites for hydro-power station development.

Construction timeline
, the development was entering the tendering process, after which the construction cost and timeline would be determined.

As of January 2020, the dam was in its early planning stage, and was expected to be operational by 2025.

See also

 Africa Dams
 Kenya Power Stations

References

External links
 Approximate Location of Karura Hydropower Station At Google Maps
KenGen in hunt for consultant

Hydroelectric power stations in Kenya
Embu County
Proposed hydroelectric power stations
Proposed renewable energy power stations in Kenya